Rest Proof Clockwork is the third studio album by English electronic music duo Plaid, released on 21 June 1999 by Warp.

Critical reception
John Bush of AllMusic gave the album 4 stars out of 5, saying, "Rest Proof Clockwork is yet another production masterpiece to file on the shelf with the rest of Plaid's work." He added: "The element that puts them far, far ahead of every other beatminer out there is a growing sense of spirit that lets the machines do the singing."

Track listing

References

External links
 
 

1999 albums
Plaid (band) albums
Warp (record label) albums